Sofya Raskhodnikova (born 1976) is a Belarusian and American theoretical computer scientist. She is known for her research in sublinear-time algorithms, information privacy, property testing, and approximation algorithms, and was one of the first to study differentially private analysis of graphs. She is a professor of computer science at Boston University.

Education and career
Raskhodnikova completed her Ph.D. at the Massachusetts Institute of Technology in 2003. Her dissertation, Property Testing: Theory and Applications, was supervised by Michael Sipser.

After postdoctoral research at the Hebrew University of Jerusalem and the Weizmann Institute of Science, Raskhodnikova became a faculty member at Pennsylvania State University in 2007. She moved to Boston University in 2017.

Other activities
While a student at MIT, Raskhodnikova also competed in ballroom dancing.
She has been one of the organizers of TCS Women, a community for women in theoretical computer science.

References

External links
Home page

1976 births
Living people
American computer scientists
Belarusian computer scientists
American women computer scientists
Theoretical computer scientists
Massachusetts Institute of Technology alumni
Pennsylvania State University faculty
Boston University faculty
American women academics
21st-century American women